Duane G. Nutt (born September 6, 1933) is a former American football player and coach. He served as the head football coach at Austin College from 1969 to 1972. A college football player at Southern Methodist University (SMU), he was drafted by the Philadelphia Eagles in the 1955 NFL Draft.

References

1933 births
Living people
American football quarterbacks
Austin Kangaroos football coaches
SMU Mustangs football players
Place of birth missing (living people)